Carole Brana is a French actress and model of Czech and Spanish descent.

Early life
After finishing high school Carole is in contract with the modeling agency Karin. She has modelled for large cosmetic brands like Chanel, Lancôme, L'Oreal or Garnier.

She was soon noticed by the casting directors and offered films. She’s represented by Laurence Bagoë in France.

In 2008 she appeared as a female lead in À l'aventure by noted director Jean-Claude Brisseau.  The following year, Carole Brana went to Hong Kong for the Franco-Chinese production Red Nights with Frédérique Bel and Carrie Ng.  Since then she has appeared in many television and film projects, including Zombinladen: The Axis of Evil Dead, On/Off and her latest Replika.
You could see her in Olivier Marchal Movie « Carbone » with Gerard Depardieu and Benoit Majimel. In 2020, she appears with Dany Boon and Philippe Katerine in « Le Lion » directed by Ludovic Colbeau Justin.

Selected filmography

References

External links

Carole Brana on Vimeo
Carole Brana on Facebook

Living people
French film actresses
French television actresses
21st-century French actresses
1985 births
French people of Spanish descent
French people of Czech descent